Linda Meyer Williams (born c. 1949) is an American sociologist and criminologist. She is Senior Research Scientist at Wellesley Centers for Women and Director of the Justice and Gender-Based Violence Research Initiative. She is also Professor Emerita of Criminal Justice and Criminology at the University of Massachusetts Lowell, where she teaches graduate and undergraduate courses on child maltreatment, research methods, and gender, race and crime. Williams has researched in the field of psychology on topics including child abuse, family violence and violence against women, and trauma and memory (including recovered memory).

Biography
Williams received her B.A. (1971) from Beaver College (now Arcadia University), and her M.A. (1972) and Ph.D. (1979) in sociology from the University of Pennsylvania, where she studied at the Center for Research in Criminology and Criminal Law.

In the 1980s Williams spent time in Bermuda, working on prison reform and social justice issues while teaching courses in criminology and sociology. From 1996 to 2005 Williams was Director of Research at the Stone Center at Wellesley College, working in the areas of child sexual abuse, rape, sex offenders, fatal child abuse, and memory of childhood trauma. Williams conducted longitudinal studies in some of these areas. In 2005 she was appointed Professor of Criminal Justice and Criminology at the University of Massachusetts Lowell.

The August 2007 issue of SAGE Journal of Child Maltreatment was co-edited by Williams and Veronica Herrera.

Contributions
Williams is notable in the field of Memory for her longitudinal studies in the area of violence against women and childhood sexual abuse. A study that has received particular interest is "Recall of childhood trauma: A prospective study of women's memories of child sexual abuse," published in 1994. It has currently been cited 441 times which is considered many in the field of Psychology.

During the 1970s, Williams collected data from 206 girls between the ages of 0 and 12 who were admitted to the hospital emergency room because of sexual abuse. They were examined and these records as well as interviews with the child and parents were documented in the hospital medical records. In the early 1990s, Williams interviewed 136 of these women in what they believed was a follow-up of study associated with the hospital they were admitted to. They were not reminded of the sexual abuse record, however, some women associated the interview with their history of sexual abuse. Of the 136 interviewed, 129 were included in the analysis.

The results showed that 38% of the women failed to report the abuse that was documented in the hospital medical records. It was deemed unlikely that they simply did not want to discuss personal matters as 68% of this group reported other incidents of sexual abuse from their childhood. The conclusion was that many women who have been sexually abused as children appeared to have forgotten the abuse. This has major implications on childhood amnesia and repressed memories.
A more detailed inspection of the results reveals that only 15 of the women (12%) reported they were never abused in childhood. It was suggested that 12% is an underestimation because the sample was only from reported abuse and not total numbers of sexually abused. Furthermore, because the abuse was reported the women may have been less likely to have forgotten the abuse compared to women whose abuse was never reported.

This final conclusion spurred a reply from Loftus, Garry, and Feldman (1994) titled "Forgetting sexual trauma: What does it mean when 38% forget?" and has been a point of discussion in regard to traumatic memories and repression.

Achievements and awards
Williams has been President for the Board of The American Professional Society on the Abuse of Children.

Selected bibliography

Books
 
 
  Preview.
  Preview.
  Preview.

Journal articles

Notes

American criminologists
American women criminologists
Arcadia University alumni
University of Pennsylvania alumni
University of Massachusetts Lowell faculty
Wellesley College faculty
Living people
Year of birth missing (living people)